The Jamaican Olympic Ice Hockey Federation (JOIHF) is the governing body of ice hockey in Jamaica.

History

The JOIHF was founded in late 2011, and was accepted into the International Ice Hockey Federation (IIHF) on 18 May 2012. The JOIHF has been a member of the Jamaica Olympic Association (JOA), as well as an associate member of the IIHF, and therefore has no right to vote in the General Assembly. The current president of the JOIHF is Don Anderson.

Ice hockey statistics
 28 players total
 2 male players
 26 junior players
 No referees
 Currently no IIHF standard rinks
 Currently not ranked in the IIHF World Ranking

National teams
 Men's national team
 Men's U20 national team

References

External links
Official website
IIHF profile

2011 establishments in Jamaica
Ice hockey in Jamaica
International Ice Hockey Federation members
Ice hockey
Sports organizations established in 2011